Platostoma menthoides is a species of plant belonging to the mint  family Lamiaceae and is found widely  in Tamil Nadu, India. Traditionally this plant used in common cold and febrifuge.

Acute oral toxicity study
In Acute Oral Toxicity Study, no mortality was found at the end of study and sign of toxicity like change in skin and fur, eyes and mucous membrane, and also respiratory, circulatory, autonomic, and central nervous system and somatomotor activity, behavior pattern, sign of tremors, convulsions, salvation, lethargy, sleep, coma were also not found.

Antipyretic activity
Ethanolic extract of bark of Platostoma menthoides on yeast-induced pyrexia shows significant effect.

References

Lamiaceae
Flora of India (region)
Flora of Sri Lanka
Plants described in 1830